Richard Burke, 8th Earl of Clanricarde (died 1709); styled Lord Dunkellin until 1687; was an Irish peer who served as Custos Rotulorum of Galway.

Career
Richard was the elder son of William Burke, 7th Earl of Clanricarde and appears to have been the first of the family to conform (to the Protestant faith), as Charles II wrote to his father congratulating him on "being thoroughly instructed in the protestant religion as it stands established, having forsaken that of Rome which hath always given jealousies to the crown". He was made Baron Dunkellin in 1680. His brother, Ulick, commanded a regiment of foot at the Battle of Aughrim where he was killed, aged twenty-two.

Clanricarde commanded a regiment of infantry during the Williamite War in Ireland and surrendered the town of Galway in July 1690. He was appointed Custos Rotulorum of County Galway. His sister Honora was married to the Jacobite leader Patrick Sarsfield.

Family
Richard married three times. Firstly, he married Elizabeth Bagnall. They had a daughter:
 Lady Dorothy Bourke. She was educated at Priest's School, Chelsea, where she performed in Purcell's Dido and Aeneas. She married Alexander Pendarves 
Secondly, he married Anne Cheeke, Countess Dowager of Warwick. Their daughter was:
 Lady Mary Bourke (d.1714)
Thirdly, he married Bridget Dillon, daughter of Henry, 8th Viscount Dillon.

Without a male heir, Richard was succeeded, as Earl, by his brother John.

Arms

References

Further reading
 Portumna Castle and its Lords, Michael Mac Mahon, 1983.
 Burke:People and Places, Eamon Bourke, Dublin, 1995.
 From Warlords to Landlords:Political and Social Change in Galway 1540-1640, Bernadette Cunningham, in "Galway:History and Society", 1996.

People from County Galway
Jacobite military personnel of the Williamite War in Ireland
Richard
Members of the Irish House of Lords
Earls of Clanricarde